Anastasiya Kulak (née Mazgo; born 4 January 1995) is a Belarusian handballer who plays for CSKA and the Belarus national team.

International honours  
Belarusian Championship: 
Winner: 2013, 2014, 2015
Silver Medalist: 2016, 2017

References

1995 births
Living people
People from Lepiel District
Belarusian female handball players
Sportspeople from Vitebsk Region